Friday Barnes, Under Suspicion is a 2015 Children's novel by R. A. Spratt. It is the second book in the Friday Barnes book series and continues the adventures of Friday, a boarding school girl, who solves mysteries.

Publication history
2015, Australia, Random House Australia 
2016, Phil Grosier (illus.), 272p. USA, Roaring Brook Press

Reception
A review of Friday Barnes, Under Suspicion in Kirkus Reviews  wrote "Spratt continues to hit just the right mix of dry humor and suspense.". In a similar vein, Booklist liked its humour and unusual mysteries.

Friday Barnes, Under Suspicion has also been reviewed by School Library Journal, and Horn Book Guide Reviews, 

It won the 2016 Davit Award for Best Children's Crime Novel.

References

External links

Library holdings of Friday Barnes, Under Suspicion

2015 Australian novels
2015 children's books
Novels set in boarding schools
Children's mystery novels
Australian mystery novels
Random House books